The 2012 Indonesia Super League U-21 group stage is contested by a total of 19 teams. They include:
18 teams from Super League
1 teams from Premier Division

The draw for the group stage was held at the PT. Liga Indonesia house in Jakarta, Indonesia on 23 March 2012. Round I of first stage started 2 April 2012 to ended on 25 April 2012 and round II started 9 May 2012 to ended on 24 May 2012.

In each group, teams play each other home-and-away in a round-robin format, but all the match was held at the same stadium with a home tournament. The winners and runners-up of each group advance to the second stage.

Groups
Each team had been numbered from 1 to 4, the numbers determine the order of the fixtures:
Match Day 1: 1 vs 4, 3 vs 2
Match Day 2: 2 vs 1, 4 vs 3
Match Day 3: 1 vs 3, 4 vs 2
Match Day 4: 4 vs 1, 2 vs 3
Match Day 5: 1 vs 2, 3 vs 4
Match Day 6: 3 vs 1, 2 vs 4

Group A

Group B

Group C

Group D

Group E

References

External links
Indonesia Super League U-21 Result 

Group stage